Mot or MOT may refer to:
 Montserrat, UNDP country code

Media
 Ministry of Truth, the propaganda ministry in George Orwell 1949 novel Nineteen Eighty-Four
 mot (magazine), former German car magazine
 Mot (Star Trek), a minor character in Star Trek: The Next Generation
 Mot (Stargate), a minor Goa'uld character in Stargate SG-1
 Mot (TV series), a French children's animated television series

Religion
 Mot (god), the Semitic god of death

Science and technology
 Magneto-optical trap in physics
 Molecular orbital theory in chemistry
 Occupational therapy, MOT is the short form for Masters of Occupational Therapy

Transport
 Minot International Airport, in North Dakota, by IATA code
 Minot (Amtrak station), by Amtrak code
 Motspur Park railway station, London, by National Rail station code

Organizations
 MOT (gallery), a gallery for contemporary art in London and Brussels
 MOT (charity), a Norwegian anti-drug and violence organization
 #MOT, a hash tag used  to show affiliation with Leeds United A.F.C. based on the chorus of "Leeds! Leeds! Leeds!"
 Motorola, (NYSE symbol:MOT)
 Michigan Opera Theatre
 The Ministry of Transport of many countries. In the UK, the acronym also lends its name to:
 MOT test, an annual test for roadworthiness
 Museum for Old Techniques in Grimbergen, Belgium
 Museum of Tolerance, a multimedia museum in Los Angeles, California

See also
 Moment of Truth (disambiguation)
 Mott (disambiguation)
 Mote (disambiguation)